Lorenzo Musetti defeated Matteo Berrettini in the final, 7–6(7–5), 6–2 to win the singles tennis title at the 2022 Napoli Cup. It was his second career ATP Tour singles title.

Tallon Griekspoor was the reigning champion from 2021, when the tournament was an ATP Challenger Tour event, but chose to compete in Antwerp instead.

Seeds
The top four seeds received a bye into the second round.

Draw

Finals

Top half

Bottom half

Qualifying

Seeds

Qualifiers

Qualifying draw

First qualifier

Second qualifier

Third qualifier

Fourth qualifier

References

External links
Main draw
Qualifying draw

Tennis Napoli Cup
Tennis Napoli Cup